The UCI Women's Road Rankings is a system of ranking road bicycle racers based upon the results in all women's UCI-sanctioned races over a twelve-month period. The world rankings were first instituted by the UCI in 1994. Points are awarded according to finishing positions in each race, with lesser points for each stage of stage races and for wearing the race leader's jersey. The road races at the Olympics and Road World Championships are worth the most points. The team rankings are calculated by summing the points of the team's four best placed riders, and the national rankings by summing the points of the nation's five best placed riders.

Since 1998, the competition has been run in parallel to the UCI Women's Road World Cup, which has included only six to twelve of the most prestigious one-day races. These are worth more points than other one-day races.

Rankings
In the races throughout the year, points are earned for an individual ranking, a team ranking and a ranking by nation.

 Individual ranking: This is calculated monthly by adding the points obtained by each rider in a women's race on the UCI calendar. Points earned during the same period of the previous year are deducted.
 Team ranking: This is calculated monthly by adding the points obtained by the top four riders in the individual ranking of each UCI Women's Team. Since 2021, this ranking has been calculated as an annual championship rather than as an ongoing ranking.
 National ranking: This is calculated by adding the points obtained by the top five riders in the individual ranking of each nation.

Current rankings

♦Change since previous week's rankings<noinclude>

Number one ranked riders and nations
The following is a list of riders who and nations which have achieved the number one position:

Teams
A ranking for teams was also previously provided on a rolling basis, but was replaced with an annual ranking for the 2021 season.

Year-End Rankings

Points
Points can be earned during stage races and one-day races during year. It depends upon the category of the race how many points could be earned. There are several categories, related to their importance. 
 World Cup races (CDM)
 World Championships (CM)
 First category races, divided into two categories:
 1.1 category (one day race)
 2.1 category (stage race) 
 Second category races, divided into two categories:
 1.2 category (one day race)
 2.2 category (stage race) 
 Continental Championships
 National Championships

See also

 UCI Men's road racing world ranking
 UCI Track Cycling World Ranking, track cycling world ranking

References

 
Rankings
Women's road cycling